LISMO is an online music service provided by au, a Japanese mobile phone brand run by KDDI, a Japanese telecommunication company. This service uses a mobile phone as a music player. This service was introduced on January 19, 2006, and the service began operating at the end of January in Japan. The first mobile phone which supports LISMO was sold on January 26, 2006. Since 2008, KDDI and Okinawa Cellular introduced 'LISMO Video', a new service with new means to enjoy video content as well.

In April 2013, KDDI acquired Taiwanese streaming service KKBOX.  The LISMO and KKBOX services were merged under the KKBOX name.  KKBOX is now expanding into other Asian markets.

Name
LISMO is short for au Listen Mobile service. The "LIS" in "LISMO" is pronounced the same as "risu", the Japanese word for "squirrel".

Mascot

The mascot of this service is LISMO-kun. It is a silhouette of a squirrel carrying an orange logo with earphones connected to it. Some original goods of this mascot are sold only at the "LISMO FOREST" of KDDI Designing Studio.

Supported phones
LISMO is supported by CDMA 1X WIN phones.

Released in 2006
Casio: W41CA,"G'zOne" (W42CA), W43CA
Hitachi: W41H, W42H, W43H, W43HII
Kyocera: W41K, W42K, W43K, W44K
Sanyo: W41SA, W42SA, W43SA
Sharp: W41SH
Sony Ericsson: W41S,"Walkman Phone" (W42S), W43S, W44S
Toshiba: "Music-HDD" (W41T), W43T, W44T, W44TII, W44TIII, W45T, "DRAPE" (W46T), W47T
au design project: "neon" (W42T by Toshiba)

Released in 2007
Casio: W51CA, W52CA,"EXILIM Phone" W53CA
Hitachi: W51H, W52SH, "Wooo Phone" W53H
Kyocera: W51K
Panasonic: W51P, W52P
Sanyo: W51SA, W52SA, W53SA
Sharp: "AQUOS Phone" (W51SH), W52SH
Sony Ericsson: W51S,"Walkman Phone" W52S, W53S
Toshiba: W51T, W52T, W53T, W54T, W55T
au design project: "Media Skin" (W52K by Kyocera), and "INFOBAR 2" (W55SA by Sanyo)

Released in 2008
Casio: W61CA,"G'zOne" (W62CA), "EXILIM PHONE" W63CA
Hitachi: W61H, "Wooo Phone" (W62H / W63H)
Kyocera: W61K, W64K, W65K
Panasonic: W61P, W62P
Pantech&Curitel: W61PT
Sanyo: W61SA, W62SA, W63SA, W64SA
Sharp: "AQUOS Phone" (W61SH / W64SH), W62SH, "URBANO" (W63SH)
Sony Ericsson: "Cyber-Shot Phone" W61S, W62S, "re" (W63S), W64S, "Walkman Phone, Xmini" (W65S)
Toshiba: W61T, W62T, "Sportio" (W63T), W64T, W65T

Released in 2009
Casio: CA001
Hitachi: "Wooo Phone" (H001)
Panasonic: P001
Sharp: SH001
Sony Ericsson: "Cyber-shot phone" S001, "Walkman Phone, Premier3(Cube)" (SOY01)
Toshiba: T001

Features

Function overview
This system provides the following functions;
 Listen to music on a mobile phone and/or a personal computer.
 Download and share music on a mobile phone and/or a personal computer.
 Copy music from a CD (compact disc) to a mobile phone.

 Share playlists with other LISMO users.
 Use downloaded music as a ringtone
 Backup address book data etc. to a personal computer

File format
Under investigation

The music file has .KMF extension on the phone and becomes .KDR on the PC, the codec is HE-AAC with 48 kbit/s bitrate, which is same as au's full track ringtone service.

Core services
 au Music Player
 A music player application for au's mobile phone. Music on the handset can be managed through this application program.
 au Music Port
 A mobile phone data managing application for a personal computer. This application is used to share and backup data from a mobile phone. Manages not only music data, but also other data in the mobile phone like camera data, PIM data, etc. Supports only Microsoft Windows
 au Music Store
 A service similar with the iTunes Music Store. Customers can download and purchase music with PC. The average price of one song is about 315 Yen (including taxes) and there are 20,000 songs available at the beginning of service.
 Uta Tomo (うたとも) (TM)
 Play list sharing service. Works over au's server.

Internationalization
This service is available only in Japan as of January 2006.

Some issues
Although all phones in Japan have an option to switch to English, phones from AU are not truly bilingual. Phones from AU use same software for all phone models (e.g. LISMO player, etc.). This software has not been translated. Thus, it is not easy for non-speakers of Japanese to use it as compared to in-built music players provided by AU competitors (such as NTT Docomo, Softbank, etc.)

Commercials
LISMO commercials, which changes approx. every 3 months, use many songs by J-pop artists. On March 5, 2008, an album titled Best of LISMO! was released. The album contains all 10 songs used in LISMO commercials that aired by the Summer 2007.

List of songs used in the commercial (in order of which the commercial aired):
 Hana - Orange Range
 Ishindenshin - Orange Range
 Keep Tryin' - Hikaru Utada
 By My Melody - Ken Hirai
 Mikazuki - Ayaka
 Lovers Again - Exile
 Cherry - Yui
 Tashika ni - Angela Aki
 Stay with Me - Kumi Koda

See also
 Sony Connect
 Mora (music store)
 iTunes Music Store
 Japanese mobile phone culture

References

External links
KDDI au
KDDI Introduces 'LISMO Video', Allows Viewing Full Movies on au Handsets

KDDI
Mobile telecommunication services
Online music stores of Japan
Products introduced in 2006
2006 establishments in Japan